Scleranthus biflorus is a cushion-bush found in Australia and New Zealand. Other common names include the knawel and two-flowered knawel or twin-flower knawel.

A common plant in grassland, particularly at higher altitudes. It may be in the form of a mat. Or a multi branched, spreading perennial herb. As of 2015, this species was under review, and new taxa were planned.

Description
A spreading, moss-like plant with dense, bright green, linear leaves about 4mm long. There are minute, double-headed green flowers in late spring. Propagation can be by division or by seed. The fungus Rhizoctonia can cause dead brown patches in this species.

References

Flora of New South Wales
Flora of Queensland
Flora of Tasmania
Flora of Victoria (Australia)
Flora of New Zealand
Caryophyllaceae